This is a list of islands in the Irish Sea.

Listed below are islands in the Irish Sea which are over 1 km2 in area, or which have a permanent population:

Other islands
Cardigan Island
Chapel Island
Chicken Rock
Church Island
Cribinau
Dova Haw
East Mouse
Foulney Island
Headin Haw
Hestan Island
Ireland's Eye
Islands of Fleet
Kitterland
Little Ross
Middle Mouse
North Stack
Puffin Island
Rough Island
St Mary's Isle
St Michael's Isle
St Patrick's Isle
Saint Tudwal's Islands
Salt Island
The Scares
Sheep Island
The Skerries
South Stack
West Mouse
Ynys Benlas
Ynys Dulas
Ynys Feurig
Ynys Gaint
Ynys Llanddwyn
Ynys Lochtyn
Ynys Moelfre
Ynys y Bîg

See also 
List of islands of England
List of islands of Ireland
List of islands of the Isle of Man
List of islands of Wales
List of islands of Europe
List of islands

References

Irish Sea
 
Islands
Irish Sea